The City of Latrobe is a local government area in the Gippsland region in eastern Victoria, Australia, located in the eastern part of the state. It is primarily urban with the vast majority of its population living within the four major urban areas of Moe, Morwell, Traralgon, and Churchill, and other significant settlements in the LGA include Boolarra, Callignee, Glengarry, Jeeralang, Newborough, Toongabbie, Tyers, Yallourn North and Yinnar. It was formed in 1994 from the amalgamation of the City of Moe, City of Morwell, City of Traralgon, Shire of Traralgon, and parts of the Shire of Narracan and Shire of Rosedale. The Yallourn Works Area was added in 1996. When formed, the municipality was called the Shire of La Trobe, but on 6 April 2000, it adopted its current name.

The city is governed by the Latrobe City Council, with its seat of local government and administrative centre located at the council headquarters, 141 Commercial Road, Morwell. It also has service centres located in Moe, Churchill and Traralgon. The city is named after the Latrobe River and Latrobe Valley, major geographical features that meander through the north of the LGA.

Industry and economy 

The City has traditionally been recognised as the centre of Victoria's electricity industry, which is derived from one of the largest brown coal reserves in the world. It also the centre of a large forestry industry which services Australian Paper's pulp and paper mill (the largest in Australia) and other sawmills. Other industries in the area include food processing (Lion Foods – Morwell), engineering, post secondary education (Federation University Australia), and the service sector. Being the largest population centre in the Gippsland region, Latrobe acts as the regional headquarters for Government agencies and private operators including banks and insurance companies.

Latrobe is also close to popular tourist attractions including the Baw Baw and Tarra-Bulga National Parks and is the natural service centre to the historic gold mining town of Walhalla.

The power generators include:
 Loy Yang A & B Power Stations, Loy Yang
 Yallourn Power Station, Yallourn
 Jeeralang Power Station, Hazelwood North

Two power stations have closed in recent years, including International Power Hazelwood (2017), and EnergyBrix (Morwell) power station and briquette manufacturing facility (2014).

Townships and localities
The 2021 census, the city had a population of 77,318 up from 73,257 in the 2016 census

^ - Territory divided with another LGA

Council

Current composition
The council is composed of four wards and nine councillors, with four councillors elected to represent the East Ward, two councillors per ward elected to represent each of the Central and West wards, and one councillor elected to represent the South Ward.

Administration and governance
The council meets in the council chambers at the council headquarters in the Morwell Municipal Offices, which is also the location of the council's administrative activities. It also provides customer services at both its administrative centre in Morwell, and its service centres in Moe and Traralgon.

See also 
 List of places on the Victorian Heritage Register in the City of Latrobe

References

External links 
 
Metlink local public transport map
Link to Land Victoria interactive maps
2005 Latrobe City Council elections results, Victorian Electoral Commission
2007 Latrobe City Council by-election results, Victorian Electoral Commission

Local government areas of Victoria (Australia)
Gippsland (region)